Cimarron Manifesto is a 2007 album by red dirt singer-songwriter Jimmy LaFave.  It is his second release for Red House Records.  The album has been critically well received and has appeared at or near the top of many folk/Americana oriented music charts.

Track listing 
 "Car Outside" (LaFave) – 4:28
 "Catch the Wind" (Donovan) – 5:23
 "This Land" (LaFave) – 4:47
 "Truth" (LaFave) – 2:59
 "Lucky Man" (LaFave) – 5:50
 "Hideaway Girl" (LaFave) – 4:22
 "That's the Way It Goes" (LaFave) – 3:17
 "Not Dark Yet" (Bob Dylan) – 6:51
 "Walk a Mile in My Shoes" (Joe South) – 4:55
 "Don't Ask Me" (LaFave) – 3:11
 "Home Once Again" (LaFave) – 6:18
 "These Blues" (LaFave) – 3:40

Credits

Musicians 
 Jimmy LaFave – acoustic and Electric guitar, mando-guitar, acoustic baritone guitar, National resophonic guitar
 John Inmon – electric guitar, Lap steel
 Andrew Hardin – electric guitar
 Radoslav Lorković – Hammond B3 organ, piano
 Bryan Peterson – piano, electric piano
 Wally Doggett – drums
 Jeff May – bass
 Glenn Schuetz –  Upright bass
 Jeff Plankenhorn – Dobro, Lap steel
 Carrie Rodriguez – violin, harmony vocals on "This Land" and "Hideaway Girl"
 Ruthie Foster harmony vocals on "Walk a Mile in My Shoes"
 Kacy Crowley – harmony vocals on "Car Outstide"

Production 
 Produced by Jimmy LaFave
 Engineered by Fred Remmert
 Recorded at Cedar Creek Studios, Austin, Texas

Artwork 
 Art Direction/Design by Bryan Peterson
 Photography by Pete Lacker

Charts

Releases

References

External links 
 Jimmy LaFave website
 Cimarron Manifesto page at Red House Records

2007 albums
Jimmy LaFave albums
Red House Records albums